Tattingers (later Tattinger's) is an American comedy-drama television series that aired by the NBC television network from October 26, 1988, to April 26, 1989, as part of its 1988 fall lineup.  After failing in the Nielsen ratings as an hour-long program, the plot and characters were briefly revived in the spring of 1989 as the half-hour sitcom Nick & Hillary.

An unaired episode, "Screwball," aired on TV Land on April 4, 1999.

Synopsis
Tattingers is the story of a divorced couple, Nick and Hillary Tattinger (Stephen Collins and Blythe Danner), along with their 2 daughters: Nina and Winnifred. They had remained co-owner partners in a posh Manhattan restaurant until Nick was shot by a drug dealer, which prompted them to sell the restaurant and move to Paris.  Their successors, however, proved incapable of properly running the restaurant, so Nick reclaimed the restaurant from them to give it another go.  Real-life Manhattan celebrities often appeared in cameo roles as themselves as Nick's exclusive clientele.

Cast
Stephen Collins as Nick Tattinger
Blythe Danner as Hillary Tattinger
Jerry Stiller as Sid Wilbur
Roderick Cook as Louis Chatham
Zach Grenier as Sonny Franks (Tattingers)
Patrice Colihan as Nina Tattinger
Chay Lentin as Winnifred Tattinger
Thomas Quinn as O'Malley (Tattingers)
Mary Beth Hurt as Sheila Bradley 
Chris Elliott as Spin (Nick & Hillary)

Episodes

Reception
This program was a ratings failure and was cancelled in January 1989.  However, NBC was apparently unwilling to give up totally on the characters or the concept, and the program was revamped into a half-hour sitcom, Nick & Hillary. This new series premiered on April 20, 1989, but proved even less successful than its predecessor and was cancelled after only two episodes.

References

General
Brooks, Tim, and Marsh, Earle, The Complete Directory to Prime Time Network and Cable TV Shows 1946–Present

NBC original programming
1980s American comedy-drama television series
1988 American television series debuts
1989 American television series endings
English-language television shows
Television series by MTM Enterprises
Television series created by Tom Fontana
Television series set in restaurants
Television shows set in New York City